Ephysteris promptella, the ratoon shootborer, is a moth of the family Gelechiidae. It is a pantropical species, found in the warmer parts of the Old World tropics to Australia. It is widely distributed in southern Europe (ranging to Slovakia in the north).

The wingspan is 8–10 mm. Adults are greyish brown. Males are smaller and have black dots, while females have white flecks.

The larvae feed on Andropogon, Oryza, Panicum, Saccharum officinarum, Sorghum, Stipa, Triticum and Zea mays. They bore the shoots of their host plant. Full-grown larvae reach a length of about 5 mm. Pupation takes place in a cocoon covered in frass which is made in debris on the soil surface.

References

Moths described in 1859
Ephysteris
Moths of Asia
Lepidoptera of Namibia
Moths of Europe
Insects of Zimbabwe
Moths of Africa
Pantropical spiders